Nicolas Favarin (born April 29, 1980) is a French professional ice hockey defenceman. He currently serves as player-head coach and general manager for Brest Albatros Hockey of the FFHG Division 1.

Favarin previously played in the Ligue Magnus for Ours de Villard-de-Lans, Brûleurs de Loups and Gothiques d'Amiens. He also played for the France men's national ice hockey team in the 2004 IIHF World Championship.

References

External links

1980 births
Living people
Brest Albatros Hockey players
Brûleurs de Loups players
French ice hockey defencemen
Gothiques d'Amiens players
Ours de Villard-de-Lans players
People from Saint-Martin-d'Hères
Sportspeople from Isère